Bakht-un-Nissa Begum ( 1547 – 2 June 1608) was a Mughal princess, the daughter of the Mughal emperor Humayun.

Birth
Bakht-un-Nissa Begum was born in 1547 in Badakhshan. Her mother was Mah Chuchak Begum. On the night of her birth Humayun had a dream, and it occurred to him that she be named Bakht-un-Nissa. Her siblings included, Mirza Muhammad Hakim, Farrukh Fal Mirza, Sakina Banu Begum, and Amina Banu Begum.

Marriages

Shah Abdul Ma'ali
During Mah Chuchak Begum's rule at Kabul, Shah Abdul Ma'ali, who belonged to the family of the great Sayyids of Termez, who had escaped from the prison at Lahore, arrived at Kabul and approached her for refuge. The Begum welcomed him, was generous to him and gave her daughter Bakht-un-Nissa Begum in marriage with him. However, soon Abdul Ma'ali grew tired of the dominating and interfering ways of Mah Chuchak Begum. He wanted Kabul for himself. So he killed the Begum 1564. Hakim Mirza was luckily rescued by Sulaiman Mirza of Badakshan, who defeated and killed Abdul Ma'ali and helped Mirza Hakim to keep his hold over Kabul.

Khawaja Hasan
After Abdul Ma'ali's death, Hakim Mirza married her to Khawaja Hasan Naqshbandi of Badakshan. With Hasan, she had two sons, Mirza Badi-uz-Zaman and Mirza Wali. After Hakim Mirza's death, Mirza Badi-uz-Zaman fled to Transoxania, where he died in exile. The begum, and her son Mirza Wali joined the court, and Akbar did much to please her. In 1619, Jahangir married Mirza Wali to Bulaqi Begum, the daughter of Prince Daniyal Mirza, the son of Akbar.

Governorship of Kabul
Her brother, Hakim Mirza was the governor of Kabul. In 1581, he rebelled in Kabul, and advanced to Lahore invading Punjab on the way. Here he was checked by Man Singh, who was the governor of Punjab at that time. Akbar declared war on him and himself went to Kabul. Mirza Hakim went to the hills. Akbar pardoned him, but the governorship of Kabul was now given to Bakht-un-Nissa Begum. Akbar also promised not to show any kindness to Hakim if he misbehaved in future. After Akbar's return from Kabul, Hakim got his old position, but all the official orders were issued in Bakht-un-Nissa's name.

Death
Bakht-un-Nissa Begum died of consumption and hectic fever on 1 June 1608.

Annotations

References

Mughal princesses
1547 births
1608 deaths
Mughal nobility
Timurid dynasty
Indian female royalty
16th-century Indian women
16th-century Indian people
17th-century Indian women
17th-century Indian people
Daughters of emperors